Kanat Islam (born 13 September 1984) is a Chinese-born Kazakhstani professional boxer who currently lives and trains in Miami. As an amateur, he represented China, winning bronze medals at the 2008 Summer Olympics, 2007 World Championships and the 2006 Asian Games.

Amateur career
At the 2004 Olympics, he lost his match to Ruslan Khairov. He qualified for the Athens Games by ending up in first place at the 1st AIBA Asian 2004 Olympic Qualifying Tournament in Guangzhou, China. In the final he defeated Aliasker Bashirov of Turkmenistan.

At the Asian Games 2006, he beat Behzodek Yunusov in round one but lost to eventual southpaw winner Bakhyt Sarsekbayev in the semi-finals 30:37.

At the 2007 World Amateur Boxing Championships, he beat Yusunov again, then upset old foes Ruslan Khairov and Bakhyt Sarsekbayev 20:14 but lost to Non Boonjumnong 20:23 in the semi-finals.

Islam beat Zambian boxer, Precious Makina, in the Men's Welterweight (69 kg) Round of 32 on the second day of the 2008 Beijing Olympics.

Olympic Games results
2004 (as a welterweight)
Defeated Sadat Tebazaalwa 29-17
Lost to Ruslan Khairov 16-26

2008 (as a welterweight)
Defeated Precious Makina 21-4
Defeated Joseph Mulema 9-4
Defeated Tureano Johnson 14-4
Lost to Carlos Banteux 4-17

World Amateur Championships results
2007 (as a welterweight)
Defeated Bohzodbek Yunusov 22-16
Defeated Gerard O'Mahony 23-17
Defeated Ruslan Khairov 26-6
Defeated Bakhyt Sarsekbayev 20-14
Lost to Manon Boonjumnong 20-23

Professional career
In 2012, Kanat turned pro and decided to train in the U.S. state of Florida. He was captain of the "Astana Arlans" in the World Series of Boxing (WSB). In January 2011, after arriving in Kazakhstan at the request of Kazakh businessman and philanthropist Baurzhan Ospanov, Islam became a citizen of Kazakhstan.

On September 9, 2017, Islam faced Brandon Cook. Islam managed to stop Cook in the ninth round, giving him his first early stoppage lost in his career.

In his next fight, Islam made easy work of Julio De Jesus. Islam landed two big overhand rights in the opening round, dropping De Jesus, who was unable to continue the fight, resulting in an impressive win for the Kazakh.

In his following fight, Islam, then ranked #8 by the WBO, faced Walter Kautondokwa, ranked #9 by the same organisation. Neither fighter stood out with his performance, Islam being the one who landed less but was more precise. Kautondokwa was the better man towards the end of the fight, but that was not enough for the judges, who had it 99-92, 97-92 and 97-92 for Islam, in what was considered a controversial decision by the judges.

Professional boxing record

References

External links
Kanat Islam - Profile, News Archive & Current Rankings at Box.Live

1984 births
Living people
Boxers at the 2004 Summer Olympics
Boxers at the 2008 Summer Olympics
Olympic boxers of China
Olympic bronze medalists for China
People from Altay Prefecture
Welterweight boxers
Olympic medalists in boxing
Asian Games medalists in boxing
Sportspeople from Xinjiang
Boxers at the 2006 Asian Games
Medalists at the 2008 Summer Olympics
Chinese male boxers
Chinese people of Kazakhstani descent
Kazakhs in China
Kazakhstani male boxers
AIBA World Boxing Championships medalists
Asian Games bronze medalists for China
Medalists at the 2006 Asian Games